Pimelea penicillaris, commonly known as sandhill riceflower, is a species of flowering plant in the family Thymelaeaceae and is endemic to Central Australia. It is an erect, dioecious shrub with densely hairy young stems, densely hairy, pale silvery green, elliptic leaves, and compact heads of white to yellow or pink flowers surrounded by 6 to 12 silky-hairy, silvery or brownish involucral bracts.

Description
Both surfaces of the leaves are densely covered with pale silvery-green hairs. Flowering mainly occurs from July to October.

Taxonomy and naming
Pimelea penicillaris was first formally described in 1883 by Ferdinand von Mueller in The Australasian Chemist and Druggist. The specific epithet (penicillaris) means "pertaining to a small brush".

Distribution and habitat
Sandhill riceflower grows in sand, often on sand dunes and is mainly found near the borders between the Northern Territory and South Australian, and between Queensland and New South Wales, in Central Australia.

References

penicillaris
Malvales of Australia
Flora of New South Wales
Flora of Queensland
Flora of the Northern Territory
Flora of South Australia
Taxa named by Ferdinand von Mueller
Plants described in 1883